Three Conflict-class destroyers served with the Royal Navy.  All were built by the White Shipyard.

As was typical for torpedo craft at the time, the Admiralty left detailed design to the builders, laying down only broad requirements.

They were armed, as was standard with ships of this type at the time, with one twelve pounder gun, two torpedo tubes and had a complement of 53 officers and men.

In September 1913 the Admiralty re-classed all the surviving 27-knotter destroyers, including Conflict and Wizard (Teazer having been sold for scrap in 1912) as A Class destroyers.

See also
A-class destroyer (1913)

Bibliography

References

 
Destroyer classes
Ship classes of the Royal Navy